"It's a Long Way to the Top (If You Wanna Rock 'n' Roll)" is a song by Australian hard rock band AC/DC. It is the first track of the group's second album T.N.T., released only in Australia and New Zealand on 8 December 1975, and was written by Angus Young, Malcolm Young and Bon Scott. The song  combines bagpipes with hard rock instrumentation; in the middle section of the song there is a call and response between the bagpipes and guitar. The original recording is in B-flat major, but it was played live in A major.

Record World said that it shows "a firm grasp on rock dynamics" and sounds "like a cross between the Stones and the Easybeats."

The song is also the first track on the internationally released High Voltage (April 1976).

The full version of the song is also on the Volts CD of the Bonfire box set, released in 1997.

This was a signature song for Bon Scott. Brian Johnson, who replaced Scott as AC/DC's lead vocalist after Scott's death in 1980, does not perform it, out of respect for his predecessor.

In January 2018, as part of Triple M's "Ozzest 100", the 'most Australian' songs of all time, "It's a Long Way to the Top (If You Wanna Rock 'n' Roll)" was ranked number 5.

Lyrics

The song chronicles the hardships endured by a rock band on tour, such as being robbed, assaulted, stoned and cheated by a greedy agent. However, the band accepts these hardships as natural on the path to stardom, saying that "It's a long way to the top/If you wanna rock 'n' roll".

Bagpipes
While jamming on new songs in the studio, co-producer George Young (the older brother of Angus and Malcolm) recalled that Bon Scott had once been in a pipe band and encouraged the band to experiment with incorporating bagpipes into the song. Scott left the studio that day and returned with a set of bagpipes purchased at a Park Street music store at what was an extortionately high price (AU$479) at the time. Bassist Mark Evans would later muse that the amount “would have bought two Strats”. Simply putting the pipe-set together proved tricky, and it became apparent Scott had never played the instrument before, having in fact been a drummer in the aforementioned pipe band. Nonetheless, Scott taught himself to play well enough to record and perform the song (initially with the help of tape loops).

However, playing the song live was made difficult by the fact that the whole band would have to tune to the drone pipe. Thus the song, though iconic of the band's early repertoire, was probably played live no more than 30 times. The last occasion was in 1976, following an incident where Scott set down the pipe-set at the corner of a stage during a concert at St Albans High School in St Albans, Victoria, Australia and they were destroyed by fans. Subsequent (relatively rare) live performances employed a recording of the song's bagpipe track or an extended guitar solo by Angus Young.

Personnel
 Bon Scott – lead vocals, bagpipes
 Angus Young – lead guitar
 Malcolm Young – rhythm guitar, backing vocals
 Mark Evans – bass guitar
 Phil Rudd – drums
 Harry Vanda, George Young – producers

Music video
The music video for "It's a Long Way to the Top (If You Wanna Rock 'n' Roll)", was filmed on 23 February 1976 for the Australian music television program Countdown. It featured the band and the members of the Rats of Tobruk Pipe band on the back of a flatbed truck travelling on Swanston Street in Melbourne. The video was directed by Paul Drane. David Olney was the cameraman. and had a budget of $380. The video was uploaded to YouTube on May 24, 2010, and it amassed over 38 million views.

Three other videos for the song exist. One version, filmed the same day as the truck version, features the group miming the song on a stage in Melbourne's City Square in front of an audience. The pipers appear here as well. This version is available in the Backtracks box set, and was uploaded to YouTube on June 11, 2022. A third version features the group simply miming the song on a soundstage, making it appear as if it were being played live (This version is considered rare and as of 2022 has not been officially released). A fourth version of the video shows the group performing the song on Australian program Bandstand on Channel 9, filmed two days prior to the first 2 videos for Countdown. with Scott singing live over the studio track appears on the Plug Me In DVD set. This fourth version was uploaded to YouTube on January 11, 2021.

Alan Butterworth, Les Kenfield and Kevin Conlon play the bagpipes in the first 2 videos.

Popularity
In May 2001, Australasian Performing Right Association (APRA) celebrated its 75th anniversary by naming the Best Australian Songs of all time, as decided by a 100-member industry panel. "It's a Long Way to the Top (If You Wanna Rock 'n' Roll)" was ranked as the ninth song on the list. In 2010 it was ranked no. 3 in Triple M's Ultimate 500 Rock Countdown in Melbourne. The top five were all AC/DC songs. It was inducted into the National Film and Sound Archive's Sounds of Australia in 2012.

The song was also used in the comedy movie School of Rock (2003), both AC/DC's version and in a performance by the film's cast, and during Only the Brave (2017).

Charts

Weekly charts

Year-end charts

Certifications

Connection to ACDC Lane
On October 1, 2004, Melbourne's Corporation Lane was officially renamed "ACDC Lane" in honour of the band (street names in the City of Melbourne cannot contain the "/" character or other punctuation marks). This change was made in part because the music video for "It's a Long Way to the Top (If You Wanna Rock 'n' Roll)" was filmed on Melbourne's Swanston Street, near ACDC Lane. The Melbourne City Council's vote to rename the street was unanimous. Bagpipers played "It's a Long Way to the Top (If You Wanna Rock 'n' Roll)" at the official renaming ceremony.

Recorded cover versions
Performed by:

 Jack Black and the cast of School of Rock - Original soundtrack (2003)
 Pat Boone - In a Metal Mood: No More Mr. Nice Guy (1997)
 Dead Moon - Destination X (1999)
 Die Krupps - Covered in Black: An Industrial Tribute to the Kings of High Voltage (tribute compilation) (1997)
 Dropkick Murphys - The Singles Collection, Vol. 2 (2005)
 Electric - A Tribute to AC/DC (2006)
 John Farnham - b-side to "Two Strong Hearts" (1988)
 John Farnham and Tom Jones - Together in Concert (2005)
 Iced Earth - Tribute to the Gods (2002)
 Lemmy - Cover Me in '80s Metal (Fantastic Price Records, 2006)
 Local H - Pack Up the Cats B-Side. Features Brendan O'Brien playing the bagpipe parts on a hurdy-gurdy.
 The Meanies - Fuse Box – An Alternative Tribute (1995)
 The Melbourne Ukulele Kollective - ABC-TV's Spicks and Specks (2006)
 Motörhead - Thunderbolt: A Tribute to AC/DC (1998)
 Nantucket - Long Way to the Top (1980)
 Scarlett Pomers - A Millennium Tribute to AC/DC (2010)
 Rawkus - AC/DC: Hometown Tribute (2002)
 Sandra Weckert - Bar Jazz (2003)
 Lucinda Williams - Little Honey (2008)
 Eric Fish - Gegen den Strom (2007, as Ein langer Weg in German)
 W.A.S.P.
 Billy Thorpe and the cast of Long Way to the Top - Long Way to the Top Live in Concert (2002)
 Eagles of Death Metal - High Voltage/ It's a Long Way to the Top (If You Wanna Rock 'n' Roll) (2019)

The Nantucket's version was promoted with a music video starring bodybuilding champion Mike Mentzer. The song was covered during the credit sequence of the comedy movie School of Rock, performed by Jack Black and the class of children he taught while masquerading as a teacher. However, the children ad-libbed their own lyrics towards the ending of the song.

Billy Corgan covered the song live as an encore on almost every show during his 2005 tour supporting his debut solo effort TheFutureEmbrace.

A dramatic re-interpretation was released by Norwegian duo Susanna and the Magical Orchestra (aka Susanna Wallumrød and Morten Qvenild) in late summer 2006 on their second album Melody Mountain, which consists entirely of cover versions. Their style is slow and melancholic with only cembalo accompaniment to Wallumrød's pure vocal, and brings out the essential sadness of the song.

The pop rock band Hanson performed this song during some of the shows on the "Walk around the World" tour, often inviting the opening acts back on stage to sing together.

Melbourne Ukulele Kollective frequently play the song live, the most notable performances being during ABC-TV's Spicks and Specks in 2004; and during the Australia Day flag-raising ceremony and people's march in 2009.

German medieval metal band In Extremo played the song on their Tranquilo-Acoustic Tour in 2009 on German Bagpipes.

On the 34th anniversary of the filming of the music video, it was recreated as part of the SLAM (Save Live Australian Music) rally, to protest liquor licensing laws which threaten live music. About ten thousand protesters marched down Swanston Street and up Bourke Street to the Victorian Parliament House, accompanied by the RocKwiz band on a flatbed truck playing the song.

References

1975 singles
1975 songs
AC/DC songs
Albert Productions singles
APRA Award winners
Atlantic Records singles
Dropkick Murphys songs
Song recordings produced by Harry Vanda
Song recordings produced by George Young (rock musician)
Songs about rock music
Songs written by Bon Scott
Songs written by Angus Young
Songs written by Malcolm Young